William Edward Rootes, 1st Baron Rootes GBE (17 August 1894 – 12 December 1964) was a British motor manufacturer. He opened his first car sales agency in 1913, leading to the global Rootes Group. During the Second World War he supervised the volume manufacture of aircraft and engines, as well as the supply of military motor vehicles and armoured fighting vehicles. He was knighted in 1942 for these services and for organising the reconstruction of bomb-damaged Coventry after its saturation bombing by the Luftwaffe on 14–15 November 1940. In the 1950s, he became a leader of Britain's export drive, and chaired a committee to found the University of Warwick with a vision of academic links with industry.

Early life
William (Billy) Rootes was born in Goudhurst, Kent. His father, William, owned a general engineering business in Goudhurst, which included bicycles. William (Snr) attended a motor show organised by Sir David Salomons in Tunbridge Wells in 1895. Billy and his brother Reginald (Reggie) shared their father's interest in things mechanical. In 1905, whilst their parents were out, Billy took Reggie out for a drive in their father's New Orleans motor car. Billy crashed the car.

Billy attended Cranbrook School, and on leaving school in 1909 was apprenticed to the Singer car company. William had moved the family business to Hawkhurst by this time, and expanded into the motor trade. Billy left Singer in 1913 to start his own car agency. He sold all of his first batch of cars within a few months of leaving Singer. The business was moved to Maidstone before the First World War, and the firm worked on the maintenance and repair of aero engines during the war.

Public honours
William and Reginald were knighted in 1942 and 1946 respectively for their work in setting up shadow factories. William was created a baron in 1959: his eldest son would accordingly become the second Baron Rootes on William's death.

Personal
Rootes married his first wife, Nora Press, in 1916.  The marriage produced two sons, William Geoffrey Rootes (1917–1992) who between 1967 and 1973 served as chairman of the family business (at that time a subsidiary of Chrysler Corporation and renamed as Chrysler United Kingdom) and Brian Gordon Rootes (1919–1971) who also held a succession of senior positions within the company between 1937 and 1967, interrupted by a period of military service during the Second World War.

In 1958, Rootes bought Ramsbury Manor, Wiltshire.

Death
William Rootes died in 1964. It had been intended that Rootes would be the first Chancellor of the University of Warwick; he is commemorated there by the Rootes Social Building, Rootes student residences, Rootes Grocery Store and the Lord Rootes Memorial Fund.

Arms

See also 
 Rootes Group

References

External links

 Rootes Archive Centre

1894 births
1964 deaths
British founders of automobile manufacturers
Knights Grand Cross of the Order of the British Empire
People from Goudhurst
Rootes Group
Hereditary barons created by Elizabeth II